Āhār Yojanā (meaning "food" in Odia) is a food subsidisation program run by the Ministry of Food Supplies & Consumer Welfare, Co-operation, Government of Odisha to provide cheap lunch to the urban poor at a price of five rupees inspired from the Amma Unavagam of Tamilnadu. It was inaugurated on April 1, 2015 by the Chief Minister of Odisha Navin Patnaik on Utkal Divas. The program provides meals in five major cities of Odisha. The actual cost of the food is around  20 but is subsidised to  5 with financial assistance from the Odisha Mining Corporation. It is targeted at more than 60,000 people per day.

Purpose 
The program is funded by the Government of Odisha. The objective is to provide cheap cooked meals to impecunious and needy people. The government launched it as a pilot project in 5 municipal corporations: Bhubaneswar, Sambalpur, Berhampur, Rourkela and Cuttack and 21 Āhār centers.  Currently 100 Āhār centers are active in 30 districts covering 73 towns. Āhār centers are mainly found in places like hospitals, bus stands or railway stations to serve cooked day meals at just  5. The hygiene of the food is checked by different municipal hospitals. Recently the government added night meals in 54 Āhār centers near hospitals to provide needy visitors with cheap and hygienic night meals.

Menu and prices 
Food provided under this program is bhāta (boiled rice) and dālmā at  5. The Āhār centres provide food at the designated places at 11 am to 3 pm every day. The night meals are served from 7:00-9:00pm.

Āhār centres 

 Cuttack : Badambadi Bus stand, Sishu Bhawan, SCB Medical 
 Bhubaneswar : Master Canteen, Baramunda, BMC office.
 Berhampur : New Bus stand, Old Bus stand,  MKCG Medical college and Railway station.
 Sambalpur : 
 Rourkela : RGH, Sector - 2, Sector - 19, Vedvyas and City Bus Stand
Barbil : Even the Barbil new bus stand has this facility.
 Bargarh: In front of Women's college, Near Govt. Bus Stand
 Talcher
 Angul
 Kamakshyanagar
balasore HQ hospital 
And # subdivision hospital nilagiri
There are in total 100 Āhār centres covering all the districts of Odisha.

See also 
 Amma Unavagam, a similar program in Tamil Nadu

References 

Government schemes in Odisha
2015 establishments in Odisha